The 1961 UCI Track Cycling World Championships were the World Championship for track cycling. They took place in Zürich, Switzerland from 27 August to 1 September 1961. Eight events were contested, 6 for men (3 for professionals, 3 for amateurs) and 2 for women.

Medal summary

Medal table

See also
 1961 UCI Road World Championships

References

Track cycling
UCI Track Cycling World Championships by year
International cycle races hosted by Switzerland
Sport in Zürich
1961 in track cycling
20th century in Zürich